Opostega ischnophaea is a moth of the family Opostegidae. It was described by Edward Meyrick in 1930. It is found in India.

The wingspan is 6–7 mm. The forewings are unusually narrow and acute-pointed. They are light grey with a violet gloss. The hindwings are pale grey.

References

Opostegidae
Moths described in 1930
Moths of Asia
Taxa named by Edward Meyrick